Pontogammaridae is a family of crustaceans belonging to the order Amphipoda.

Genera

Genera:
 Andrussovia Derzhavin, 1927
 Compactogammarus Stock, 1974
 Euxinia Tucolesco, 1933

References

Amphipoda